Myrmecophila humboldtii is a species of orchid. The species is named after Alexander von Humboldt. Its natural distribution is from Venezuela and the ABC islands (Bonaire and Curaçao; apparently extinct in Aruba).

References

Laeliinae